This is a list of English football transfers for the 2009–10 winter transfer window. Only moves featuring at least one Premier League or Championship club are listed. As punishment for a reported attempt to have Gaël Kakuta abandon Lens' youth team, Chelsea were originally banned by FIFA from signing new players during the winter period; however, the Court of Arbitration for Sport suspended the transfer ban, which will allow Chelsea to sign new players. Portsmouth had a transfer embargo placed on them but it was removed, which allowed Portsmouth to only sign players for Free or on Loan.
The winter transfer window opened on 1 January 2010, although a few transfers took place prior to that date. The window closed at 17:00 on 1 February. Players without a club may join at any time. Clubs below Premiership level may also sign players on loan at any time. Clubs may also sign a goalkeeper on an emergency loan, if all others are unavailable.

Transfers

 Player will officially join his new club on 1 January 2010.

Notes and references
General
   

   
   
Specific
   
   

English
Transfers Winter 2009-10
Winter 2009-10